Liberty, Virginia may refer to:
The historic name for Bedford, Virginia
Liberty, Caroline County, Virginia, an unincorporated community in Caroline County
Liberty, Fauquier County, Virginia, an unincorporated community in Fauquier County
Liberty, Halifax County, Virginia, an unincorporated community in Halifax County
Liberty, Highland County, Virginia, an unincorporated community in Highland County
Liberty, Tazewell County, Virginia, an unincorporated community in Tazewell County